The Bissau-Guinean ambassador in Beijing is the official representative of the Government in Bissau to the Government of the People's Republic of China.

List of representatives

References 

Ambassadors of Guinea-Bissau to China
China
Guinea-Bissau